The Team Event of the 2019 European Diving Championships was contested on the first day of the competition, 5 August.

Results
31 athletes from 8 national teams participated at the single-round event.

References

T